Craig A. Miller (18 October 1962 – August 2021) was a professional tennis player from Australia.

Junior years
Miller was the boys' singles champion at the 1980 Australian Open, beating Wally Masur in the final. The Australian had been runner-up the previous year, to Greg Whitecross. He was also a semi-finalist at the 1980 US Open and with Pat Cash won the doubles title at the 1982 Australian Open.

Professional career
In 1982, Miller was a quarter-finalist at the Sydney Outdoor tournament and lost in the doubles final of the New South Wales Open, partnering Cliff Letcher.

The following year he made the semi-finals of the Melbourne Outdoor event. Also in 1983, Miller had a win over John Lloyd in the Wimbledon Championships and won two doubles titles, at Hong Kong and Adelaide, both times in an unseeded pairing.

Miller and partner Laurie Warder were semi-finalists at the 1985 Australian Open.

In 1986, he started the season well by reaching the singles quarter-finals at Auckland but wouldn't appear on tour again until September, as a result of a benign tumour that he had to have removed from his vocal cords. During this time he wasn't able to travel overseas due to restrictions on his medication and he instead spent his time coaching at the Australian Institute of Sport. He played for another year and a half, before retiring after the 1988 Australian Open.

Coaching
Miller was the head development coach of Tennis Australia for seven years and later ran his own tennis program, IQ Tennis.

Grand Prix career finals

Doubles: 3 (2–1)

Challenger titles

Doubles: (2)

Death
Miller died in August 2021 after suffering from throat cancer.

References

1962 births
Living people
Australian male tennis players
Australian Open (tennis) junior champions
Australian tennis coaches
Tennis people from New South Wales
People from Young, New South Wales
Grand Slam (tennis) champions in boys' singles
Grand Slam (tennis) champions in boys' doubles